Lady from Lisbon is a 1942 British comedy film directed by Leslie S. Hiscott and starring Francis L. Sullivan, Jane Carr, Martita Hunt and Charles Victor.

It was shot at the Riverside Studios in London. The film's sets were designed by the art director James A. Carter.

Plot
When the Nazis steal Leonardo da Vinci's Mona Lisa, South American art lover Minghetti travels to Lisbon to spy for the Germans in return for the famous painting.

Inept Nazi agents, counterspies, racketeers and multiple fakes of the masterpiece soon confound all attempts.

The artist Ganier is murdered. Lady Wellington Smyth is accused.

The painting is swapped for a poor copy under Minghetti's nose.

Cast
 Francis L. Sullivan as Minghetti 
 Jane Carr as Tamara
 Martita Hunt as Susan Wellington Smythe
 George Street as Hauptmann
 Gerhardt Kempinski as Flugel
 Tony Holles as Anzoni
 Leo De Pokorny as Mario
 Wilfrid Hyde White as Ganier
 Ian Fleming as Adams
 Charles Victor as Porter
 John Godfrey as Clerk

References

External links 
 

1942 films
1942 comedy films
1940s English-language films
Films directed by Leslie S. Hiscott
British comedy films
British black-and-white films
Films set in Lisbon
Films shot at Riverside Studios
1940s British films